Louis Barnes Perry (March 4, 1918September 28, 2013) was an American academic who was the eighth president of Whitman College in Walla Walla, Washington.

Biography
Perry was born in 1918. He attended UCLA. He taught at Pomona College from 1950 to 1959. He then became president of Whitman College, a role he held until 1967.

References

University of California, Los Angeles alumni
Presidents of Whitman College
1918 births
2013 deaths
Pomona College faculty
Place of birth missing
Place of death missing